Wang Menghui (born January 1960) is a Chinese politician, and the current Communist Party Secretary of Hubei. Previously he served as Minister of Housing and Urban-Rural Development. Among other roles, he has served as party chief of Xiamen, and party chief of Shenyang.

Biography
Originally from Yancheng, Jiangsu. He attended the department of architecture at Tsinghua University. After graduating from university, he became an instructor at his alma mater. He also attended Warsaw University of Technology. In 1993, he abandoned academia and entered politics in Guangdong, at a county-level city under Guangzhou. In May 2004, he became mayor of Shanwei. In 2006, he obtained his master's in engineering.

In September 2008, he became party chief of Yunfu. In December 2011, he became vice governor of Fujian. In May 2013, he became party chief of Xiamen.

In August 2016, Wang was named Communist Party Secretary of Shenyang; in December 2016, he was named deputy party secretary of Liaoning province. In June 2017, Wang was named Minister of Housing and Urban-Rural Development.

In June 2017, he was appointed minister of Housing and Urban-Rural Development, and held that office until March 2022.

On 29 March 2022, he was made Communist Party Secretary of Hubei, succeeding Ying Yong.

References

External links 
 王蒙徽率团赴美考察访问 提升厦门国际化水平 CE.cn 2014-05-07

1960 births
Living people
People from Yancheng
Tsinghua University alumni
People's Republic of China politicians from Jiangsu
Chinese Communist Party politicians from Jiangsu
Ministers of Housing and Urban-Rural Development of the People's Republic of China
Members of the 19th Central Committee of the Chinese Communist Party